Eppendorf  is one of thirteen quarters in the Hamburg-Nord borough of Hamburg, Germany, and lies north of the Außenalster. In 2020 the population was 24,806.

History

Eppendorf, first mentioned as Eppenthorp in 1140, is Hamburg's oldest village. Its name originates either from the old Germanic epen (on the water) or from the personal name Ebbo/Eppo. It is possible, but unlikely, that it was named after Ebbo, the archbishop of Reims. During the restoration of the St. Johannis Church, which was first mentioned in 1267, ruins of an older stone tower were found.

In the 19th century, Eppendorf gained popularity among the affluent people in Hamburg. The low-lying, moist land was banked up and built on. The last area of moorland, the Eppendorfer Moor, was placed under nature protection in 1982.

In 1894, Eppendorf was transferred to Hamburg.

Geography
In 2007 according to the statistical office of Hamburg and Schleswig-Holstein, the quarter Eppendorf has an area of 2,7 km².

The Isebekkanal flows into the Alster in Eppendorf. The Tarpenbek flows through the Eppendorfer Mühlenteich, which is where the swans spend the winter, into the Alster, also in Eppendorf.

Parks
 Hayns Park
 Meenkwiese
 Eppendorfer Mühlenteich
 Kellinghusenpark
 Eppendorfer Park
 Seelemannpark

Transport
Eppendorf has the U-Bahn station Kellinghusenstraße, which is an interchange station between the U1 and U3 lines. Several bus routes meet at Eppendorfer Marktplatz.

Infrastructure
The University Medical Center Hamburg-Eppendorf (Universitätsklinikum Hamburg-Eppendorf) was built starting in 1879 and founded in 1884. It has been a university medical center since 1934.

The swimming baths, Holthusenbad, were designed by Fritz Schumacher and erected between 1912 and 1914.

Politics
These are the results of Eppendorf in the Hamburg state election:

Culture
The theatre Lustspielhaus is located in Eppendorf, as was the cabaret theatre, Kabarett Mon Marthe.

A museum covering the life of Ernst Thälmann is located in the Tarpenbekstraße.

The music venue Onkel Pö was located in Eppendorf.

A monthly magazine about the quarter, Der Eppendorfer is published by the local residents association (Eppendorfer Bürgerverein).

Recurring events

Since 1982, the Eppendorfer Landstraßenfest street festival has been held annually in May.
Every August, the Erikastraßen-Fest, a smaller street festival is held.

Education
 Wolfgang-Borchert-Schule (Hauptschule and Realschule, and formerly Grundschule)
 Grundschule Knauerstraße
 Schule Robert-Koch-Straße
 Marie-Beschütz-Schule (formerly Schule Schottmüllerstraße)
 Gymnasium Eppendorf
 Staatliche Handelsschule Kellinghusenstraße (H 13)
 Gesamtschule Eppendorf (formerly Gymnasium Curschmannstraße)

People
 Wolfgang Borchert, German writer, born in Eppendorf in 1921, attending the school which was later renamed after him, the Wolfgang-Borchert-Schule, then called Erica-Schule
 Ernst Thälmann, communist leader
 Uwe Seeler, footballer, who attended the Wolfgang-Borchert-Schule
 Samy Deluxe, rapper, who attended the Gesamtschule Eppendorf
 Jan Delay (Jan Eißfeldt), rapper of the group Beginner, who talks with Samy Deluxe on the track Lang is her about his youth in Eppendorf
 Claus Johannes Timmermann (18 February 1842 - 7 January 1919), the last Bauernvogt of Eppendorf
 The country group Texas Lightning, who represented Germany at the  Eurovision Song Contest 2006, and comes from Eppendorf
 Karl Dall, comedian who lived in Eppendorf

Notes

References

 Statistical office Hamburg and Schleswig-Holstein Statistisches Amt für Hamburg und Schleswig-Holstein, official website

Further reading
Helmut Alter: Eppendorf. Leben und Wohnen im Hamburger Vorort. Hans Christians Verlag Hamburg 1976
 Hakim Raffat: Eppendorf und seine Parks. 2. überarb. & erw. Auflage 2007, Published by the Stadtteilarchiv Eppendorf. Abera Verlag. Hamburg.

External links

 Project about the different prospects for children from the Hamburg quarters of Eppendorf and Jenfeld

Eppendorf
Hamburg-Nord